Greenfield Village was an Amtrak station in Dearborn, Michigan served by the Wolverine. It closed to regular seasonal service in 2006 and to all service in 2014. The station had a single side platform serving one of the two tracks of the Michigan Line. A pedestrian crossing from the platform led to The Henry Ford at Smiths Creek Depot on the parallel Weiser Railroad.

History

Prior to 2006, the station was a regular, but seasonal stop (summer only). After 2006, the station was only used for reserved tour groups of 20 or more people, similar to Colonel Allensworth State Historic Park station in California.

Amtrak's main station in Dearborn, opened in 1978, was located well east of the downtown area, thus requiring a separate stop to serve The Henry Ford. The new station opened on December 10, 2014, and Greenfield Village station was closed.

References

External links

 Greenfield Village Amtrak Station & Smiths Creek Depot (USA RailGuide -- Train Web)
 The Henry Ford Museum - Historic Rides and Transportation
 Smiths Creek Depot (Michigan Passenger Stations)

The Henry Ford
Former Amtrak stations in Michigan
Buildings and structures in Dearborn, Michigan
Railway stations in Wayne County, Michigan
Former Michigan Central Railroad stations
Railway stations closed in 2014
Railway stations in the United States opened in 1929